Ashok Sawhny (born 1937) is bilingual Indian poet, film producer and businessman. He is founder and President of Monarch International (established 1978), an international trading company with offices in several countries.

Early life 
Sawhny was born in the year 1937 in Lahore, Pakistan. He attended Modern School, New Delhi followed by St. Stephen's College, Delhi

Career
Sawhny worked with Indian Industry till 1977, before starting with his own company, Monarch International in 1978,. trading internationally with offices in several countries. He has also critically acclaimed film, Listen Amaya (2013), starring Farooq Shaikh and Deepti Naval.

Ashok sawhney has penned 13 solo poetry books so far. He has been published in anthologies alongside A. P. J. Abdul Kalam, Gulzar, Ruskin Bond, Deepti Naval, Shashi Tharoor, Irshad Kamil, and Kapil Sibal.

Bibliography
The Sands of Time and Other Poems 
As Time Goes By: And Other Poems 
Chequerboard and Other Poems 
Fruit Salad: Poems for Children 
To Have Loved 
The Tyranny of Truth and Other Poems 
The Mango Grove at Kashipur 
Think Poetry, Think Haikus 
11 Short Stories 
Till the End of Time and Other Poems

References

External links
 Ashok Sawhny, website

1937 births
Living people
Businesspeople from Delhi
Indian male poets
St. Stephen's College, Delhi alumni
English-language poets from India